The Battle of Acre (also known as the Fourth Battle of Acre) occurred on 3 November 1840. 
The Oriental Crisis of 1840 was an episode in the Egyptian–Ottoman War in the eastern Mediterranean, triggered by the self-declared Khedive of Egypt and Sudan Muhammad Ali Pasha's aims to establish a personal empire in the Ottoman province of Egypt.

Mehmet Ali had refused the conditions the Quadrilateral Alliance sought to impose.  On the 3 November Acre was shelled by a combined British, Austrian and Ottoman fleet under Admiral Sir Robert Stopford. The town was largely destroyed and the Egyptians withdrew after Archduke Friedrich personally led a small landing party of Allied troops to capture the Citadel. Muhammad Ali of Egypt then came to terms.

Gallery

See also
 Saint Jawarjius Church and Monastery

References

External links

Battles involving Ottoman Egypt
Acre (1840)
Battles involving Austria
Conflicts in 1840
Acre, Israel
November 1840 events
1840 in Asia